Kanchan Nagar Union is a union parishad of Fatikchhari Upazila of Chittagong District.

The village has tea garden, rubber garden, forest garden and forest office. There are one high school, 3 Dakhil Madrasahs and 7 primary schools in this village. There is a service camp, mosque,  temple, an ashram center,  Canals, Bazars and many more.

Many freedom fighters were martyred during this liberation in the village. To facilitate administrative work in the year 3, then the administrator Kanchan Nagar Union was two villages Kanchanpur and Manikpur was formed with two villages Kanchan Nagar Union was formed.

Currently there are three small villages in Kanchan Nagar Union Parishad. There are three traditions with the name of Kanchan Nagar Union, where most of the villages of North Kanchan Nagar village were dominated by the Buddhists. Hindu, Muslim and Buddhist people floated in this village.

There is a Hindu temple in the middle village of Kanchan Nagar, the name of this temple is Kanchan Nath Temple. Many say that this village is named after his name Kanchan Nagar. No one can say the exact information.

The Name of Center mosque of this Union is Rustum Fakir Jame Mosque. It's a historical Mosque of this Area. It's also known as Gayebi Mosjid.

Geography

Area of Kanchan Nagar :

Location

North: Manikchhari Upazila

East: Lakshmichhari Upazila

South: Rangamatia union

West: Paindong union

address :

Union : 7 No. Kanchan Nagar Union Parishad

Upazila : Fatickchari

Thana : Fatickchari

District : Chittagong

Bangladesh.

Population
As of 2011 Bangladesh census, Kanchan nagar union has a population of 29,258.

Of these, 14368 are male and 14890 are female. The total family is 5427.

Village-based Population:

 Middle Kanchan Nagar - 6532
 South Kanchan Nagar - 8167
 North Kanchan Nagar - 5377
 Manik Pur - 6672
 Araji Fenuaa - 570
 17no Lot Roktochori - 3252
 South Tila Para

Marketplaces and bazars

Bazar:

1. Kanchan Nagar Temuhani Bazar is a Capital Vegetable Bazar & Marketplace in this Village. (This is a Daily Bazar in this village)

2. Raja Rastar Matha Bazar is a 2nd Vegetable Bazar in this Village. (This is a Daily Bazar in this village)

3. Samurhut Bazar is a 3rd Vegetable Bazar in this Village (Weekly 2 days, Friday and Monday)

4. Kanchan Nagar Hat is 4th Vegetable Bazar in this Village (Weekly 2 days, Saturday & Wednesday)
5. Janata Bazar, South Kanchan Nagar

Villages and mouzas

Villages:

1. Middle Kanchan Nagar, Ward No : 01

2. Middle Kanchan Nagar, Ward No : 02

3. North Kanchan Nagar, Ward No : 03

4. West Kanchan Nagar, Ward No : 04

5. South Kanchan Nagar, Ward No : 05

6. South Kanchan Nagar, Ward No : 06

7. Manikpur, Ward No : 07

8. Manikpur, Ward No : 08

9. Manikpur, Ward No : 09

Education & Hospital
Educational Institute:

Kanchan Nagar Bohu Mukhi High School
Bainnachola-Manikpur High School
Shahanshah Syed Ziaul Huq Maizbhandari High School
Kanchan Nagar Rustumia Monirul Islam Dakhil Madrasah
kanchan Nagar Hat Islamia Madrasah
Keramotia Ahommodia Mohila Madrasah
South Kanchan Nagar Khademul Islam  Madrasah (Kawmi Madrasah)
Sishu Kanon KG School
Kanchan Nagar Rustumia Government Primary School
Kanchan Nagar Government Primary School
Manikpur Government Primary School
Others

Hospitals:

 Kanchan Nagar Health & Family Welfare Center.
 Abdul Monayem chowdhury General Hospital.

References

 Kanchan Nagar Website

External links
 https://web.archive.org/web/20110727203859/http://www.lcgbangladesh.org/derweb/Population_Union.xls

Unions of Fatikchhari Upazila